The administrator of the Small Business Administration is the head of the Small Business Administration of the United States Government. President Barack Obama announced in January 2012 that he would elevate the SBA administrator into the Cabinet, a position it last held during the Clinton administration.

List of administrators

References